Charles Michael Calderon (born March 12, 1950) is an American attorney and politician who served in both chambers of the California State Legislature.

Early life and education 
Calderon was born on March 12, 1950, in Montebello, California. He graduated from California State University, Los Angeles and earned a J.D. degree from the UC Davis School of Law.

Career 
Prior to his 1982 election to the Assembly, Calderon was a prosecutor and also served on the Montebello School Board.

Calderon was first elected to the Assembly in 1982. In 1988–89, he became leader of a power struggle for control of the Assembly. The "Gang of Five", included Calderon, Gary Condit, Steve Peace of Chula Vista, Gerald Eaves of Rialto, and Rusty Areias of Los Banos. Self-identified conservative Democrats, the group attempted to wrest power from Willie Brown, then Speaker of the Assembly. Calderon was nominated for the office of Speaker, but Brown prevailed by a vote of 40–34. Brown stripped all five members of committee leadership positions and staff.

In 1990, Calderon left the Assembly, and he was elected to the California State Senate. From September 1996 until the end of his term, Calderon served as the first Hispanic Senate Majority leader in California history. He ran unsuccessfully for Attorney General of California in 1998, losing the primary to Bill Lockyer. Prior to his 2006 election to the Assembly, he served as California Health Care Commissioner and was a partner with the law firm of Nossaman. During his second term in the Assembly he served as Majority Leader between  2010 and 2012.

Personal life 
His brothers Ronald S. Calderon and Thomas M. Calderon have both served in the State Assembly. Ronald held Charles's former Senate seat until 2014; Thomas has been out of the legislature since an unsuccessful run for Insurance Commissioner in 2002.

Calderon and his wife, Lisa, have three children. Calderon's son, Ian, served in the state assembly from 2012 to 2020, representing the 57th district. Lisa won Ian's Assembly seat in 2020.

References

External links
Join California Charles Calderon

1950 births
Charles
Living people
American prosecutors
California lawyers
Democratic Party California state senators
California State University, Los Angeles alumni
Democratic Party members of the California State Assembly
People from Montebello, California
UC Davis School of Law alumni
American politicians of Mexican descent
Hispanic and Latino American state legislators in California
21st-century American politicians